Gerald Percy Fox (29 May 1923 – 1 September 2018), better known as Carl Duering, was a German-born British actor whose best-known role is as Dr. Brodsky in Stanley Kubrick's A Clockwork Orange. He died in London in September 2018 at the age of 95.

Selected filmography

 Appointment in London (1953) - German Duty Officer (uncredited)
 The Red Beret (1953) - Rossi
 Twist of Fate (1954) - 2nd Sailor (uncredited)
 The Divided Heart (1954) - Postman
 The Colditz Story (1955) - German Officer
 Lets Be Happy (1957) - Customs Inspector
 Seven Thunders (1957) - Major Grautner
 Escapement (1958) - Blore
 Battle of the V-1 (1958) - Scientist
 The Great Van Robbery (1959) - Delgano
 Strip Tease Murder (1961) - Rocco
 The Guns of Navarone (1961) - German Radar Operator (uncredited)
 Fate Takes a Hand (1961) - Mike
 The Main Attraction (1962) - Bus Driver (uncredited)
 Operation Crossbow (1965) - German Officer Arriving at Rocket Plant (uncredited)
 Arabesque (1966) - Hassan Jena
 Duffy (1968) - Bonivet
 Darling Lili (1970) - General Kessler
 Underground (1970) - Stryker
 Rend mig i revolutionen (1970) - Major Bodenschatz 
 A Clockwork Orange (1971) - Dr. Brodsky
 King, Queen, Knave (1972) - Enricht 
 Gold (1974) - Syndicate Member
 Operation Daybreak (1975) - Karl Hermann Frank
 Voyage of the Damned (1976) - German Ambassador (uncredited)
 Group Portrait with a Lady (1977) - Französischer Offizier (uncredited)
 The Boys from Brazil (1978) - Trausteiner
  (1979)
  (1981) - Rabbi
 Possession (1981) - Detective
 Smiley's People (1982) - Walther
 Inside the Third Reich (1982) - Hugo Elsner
  (1983) - Dr. Lohmeyer
 Das Wagnis des Arnold Janssen (1983) - Rouard de Card - Dominikanerprovinzial
 War and Remembrance (1988) - Dr. Carl Goerdeler
 Destroying Angel (1990) - Publisher
 Déjà Vu (1997) - Jewellery Shop Owner in Paris
 Saltwater (2000) - Konigsberg (final film role)

References

External links

Carl Duering at Aveleyman

1923 births
2018 deaths
20th-century British male actors
British male film actors
British male television actors
Male actors from Berlin
German emigrants to England